The 1974 United States Senate election in Georgia took place on November 5, 1974. Incumbent Democratic U.S. Senator Herman Talmadge was re-elected to a fourth consecutive term in office, winning large victories in the primary and general elections.

Democratic primary

Candidates
 Carlton Myers, Pine Mountain veterinarian
 Herman Talmadge, incumbent U.S. Senator since 1953

Results

General election

Results

See also 
 1974 United States Senate elections

References

1974
Georgia
United States Senate